Nam Shan is a village in the Siu Lek Yuen area of Sha Tin District, Hong Kong.

Administration
Nam Shan is a recognised village under the New Territories Small House Policy. It is one of the villages represented within the Sha Tin Rural Committee. For electoral purposes, Nam Shan is part of the Kwong Hong constituency, which was formerly represented by Ricardo Liao Pak-hong until July 2021.

References

External links
 Delineation of area of existing village Shek Kwu Lung and Nam Shan (Sha Tin) for election of resident representative (2019 to 2022)

Villages in Sha Tin District, Hong Kong
Siu Lek Yuen